Paimokia is a genus of millipedes belonging to the family Xystodesmidae.

The species of this genus are found in Western North America.

Species:

Paimokia haydeniana
Paimokia modestior 
Paimokia telodonta

References

Xystodesmidae